Ellen Shipley (born March 24, 1949 in New York City, New York, United States) is an American musician and songwriter.

Career
At sixteen years old, Shipley got a NYC Cabaret license. She performed a duo act in Greenwich Village in the early 70's with Steve Fields. Shipley was noticed by a Tommy Mottola associate, in a jazz club in NYC, Pearl’s Place, and signed to Mottola's company. Nowels approached Shipley in a Woodstock, NY cafe, asked Shipley write with him for a Belinda Carlisle solo album.

"It was Stevie Nicks who matched Belinda (Carlisle) with songwriters Rick Nowels and Ellen Shipley and changed her life."

Shipley is best known for her work with Rick Nowels. Together they have written for Kim Wilde and worked on the Belinda Carlisle albums Belinda, Heaven on Earth, Runaway Horses, and Live Your Life Be Free. Shipley has also done solo work, collaborated with Ralph Schuckett, and appeared on 13 December 1980 on Saturday Night Live. In 1994, Great Performances episode September Songs: The Music of Kurt Weill featured David Johansen, Ellen Shipley, Ralph Schuckett, and Bob Dorough singing "Alabama Song" in a beat-up old pickup truck in search of whiskey. She,  with Nicky Holland, co-wrote "Will We Ever Learn", and it was recorded for Oleta Adams' Circle of One album.

"My Song Was Played 3.1 Million Times on Pandora. My Check Was $39..."

Paste magazine archived, for playback, a 12-song performance, at the Paradise in  Boston, MA, from 1980-10-17.

In 2008, Shipley directed, for the stage, Desert Sunrise, in Los Angeles.

Shipley was nominated for a Grammy award.

Personal life
Shipley is from Canarsie, Brooklyn, and married Ralph Schuckett.

Discography

Solo Releases 
Ellen Shipley, New York International Records (1979)
 “I Surrender”
 “Man Of The World”
 “Catch The Cobra”
 “Heroes Of Yesterday”
 “Good Thing Goin”
 “I’m Jumping Out Of My Skin”
 “Little Sister”
 “Last Tears”
 “Stray Dog”
 “Over The Edge”
Breaking Through the Ice Age, RCA Records(1980) (David Tickle, producer)
 “Heart To Heart”
 “Fotogenic”
 “Jamie”
 “This Little Girl”
 “Talk Don’t Shout”
 “Solo”
 “Lost Without Your Love”
 “Promise To Keep”
 “Living For The Tenderness”
Call of the Wild, Capitol Records (1983)
 “Heart Out Of Time”
 “Love’s Out On The Line”
 “Stranded”
 “I Come Undone”
 “Look The Other Way”
 “Call Of The Wild”
 “Let Me Take You Under”
 “He’s Not There”
 “Fugitive Kind”

Songwriting 
 “Spirit Of Love”, Laura Branigan, Touch (1987)
 “I Come Undone”, Jennifer Rush, Heart Over Mind (1987)
 Belinda Carlisle, Heaven On Earth (1987) 
 “Heaven Is A Place On Earth”
 “Circle In The Sand”
 “The Real Feel”, Maria Vidal, Maria Vidal (1987)
 “Confess”, Eric Martin, I'm Only Fooling Myself (1987)
 The Graces, Perfect View (1989)
 “Lay Down Your Arms”
 “When The Sun Goes Down”
 “Perfect View”
 “Fear No Love” 
 “50,000 Candles Burning”
 Belinda Carlisle, Runaway Horses (1989)
 “Leave A Light On”
 “Runaway Horses”
 Vision of You"
 “La Luna”
 (We Want) The Same Thing
 "Whatever It Takes"
 “Will We Ever Learn”, Oleta Adams, Circle Of One (1990)
 Belinda Carlisle, Live Your Life Be Free (1991)
 “Live Your Life Be Free”
 “Do You Feel Like I Feel?”
 “Half The World”
 “Emotional Highway”

 “Love Is Holy”, Kim Wilde, Love Is (1992)
 “Tongue-Tied And Twisted”, Nicky Holland, Nicky Holland (1992)
 Jennifer Rush, Jennifer Rush (1992) 
 “Vision Of You”
 “Unwanted Child”
 “Sail Away”, Dionne Warwick, ‘Til Their Eyes Shine…The Lullaby Album (1992)
 “C’est Mieux Que D’aimer”, Mario Pelchat, Pelchat (1993)
 Belinda Carlisle, Real (1993)
 Lay Down Your Arms"
 "One With You"
 “Vision Of You”, Lea Salonga, Lea Salonga (1993)
 "Look At Me", Keely Hawkes, Just A Page (1993)
 “Body And Soul”, Anita Baker, Rhythm Of Love (1994)
 “These Lovin’ Eyes”, David Hasselhoff, Du (1994), David Hasselhoff (1995)
 “Remember September”, Belinda Carlisle, A Woman & A Man (1996)
 "Since I Laid Eyes On You", Faith Hill, Piece Of My Heart (1996)
“Live Forever”, Midge Ure, Breathe (1996)
 “Look At Me”, Trine Rein, Beneath My Skin (1996)
 “Sex Will Keep Us Together”, Divinyls, Underworld (1996)
 “Yearbook”, Hanson, Middle Of Nowhere (1997)
 "Just In Case", Erikah Karst, Grown Woman (1997)
 “Thinking Of You (I Drive Myself Crazy)”, ‘Nsync, ‘Nsync (1998)
 Beyond Pink, Beyond Pink (1999)
 "Boys Will Be Boys"
 "Girl Of Today"
 "Wonderland"
 "One Love, True Love"
 "Rainbow"
 "Does She Think About Me", Damon Johnson, Dust (2000)
 “You Don’t Have To Be Alone”, Jacob Young, Jacob Young (2001)
 "I Believe", Wendy Wright, As I Am (2007)
 “Goodbye Just Go”, Belinda Carlisle, The Anthology (2014)
 “A Million Miles Away”, Tiffany, A Million Miles (2016)

References

https://www.discogs.com/artist/233864-Ellen-Shipley
https://www.allmusic.com/artist/ellen-shipley-mn0000183359/credits

External links
 ellenshipleymusic.com
 imdb
 ibdb

1949 births
Living people
Songwriters from New York (state)